Kondamanjulur (from konda mundu ooru, meaning the village before hills) is a village in Janakavaram Pangulur Mandal, Prakasam district, Andhra Pradesh,

References

Villages in Prakasam district